The White House in Brentsville, Virginia was built in 1822.  It was listed on the National Register of Historic Places in 1989. It is also known as the Williams-Dawe House.

It is significant as "the finest example of Federal, residential architecture in Brentsville, Virginia" and is probably the oldest surviving house in the village.  It was first the home of a prominent widow, said to have been the first post-mistress in either Prince William County, or the State of Virginia, and is believed to have been a social gathering place. Lived in from 1941 through the 1990s by Agnes Webster and her family (rented to the John Curd family in 1959–1962) 

The house is a two-story Federal style gabled brick building, with double chimneys at each end.  The brickwork is Flemish bond on the front and 5 course American bond in the rear.

In April 2022 the house was purchased by Prince William County. Work began clearing the house in June 2022.

References

External links
Brentsville.com
Historical Markers database
White House, State Route 619, Manassas, Manassas, VA: 1 photo at Historic American Buildings Survey

Historic American Buildings Survey in Virginia
Houses on the National Register of Historic Places in Virginia
Federal architecture in Virginia
1820s architecture in the United States
Houses in Prince William County, Virginia
National Register of Historic Places in Prince William County, Virginia